Heth Township is one of twelve townships in Harrison County, Indiana, United States. As of the 2010 census, its population was 1,278 and it contained 573 housing units.

History
The township was named for Harvey Heth, who surveyed much of Southern Indiana. He is buried in the western part of the township and was a major landholder in the area during the early 19th century.

It contains Squire Boone Caverns and Historic Village where Squire Boone, the brother of Daniel Boone, is buried. In the early 19th century, the township was also home to Isiah and James Boone.

Geography
The township includes the incorporated town of Mauckport, as well as the unincorporated town of Central. The township is bordered to the south by the Ohio River and Kentucky. It contains the only bridge over the Ohio River in Harrison County.

Mail is delivered from a post office in Mauckport; the township's ZIP codes are 47142 and 47143.

The township is part of the South Harrison School District and its children attend Heth-Washington Elementary, which is also attended by Washington Township children. Middle and high-school age children attend Corydon Central High School in Corydon.

References

External links
 Indiana Township Association
 United Township Association of Indiana

Townships in Harrison County, Indiana
Townships in Indiana